Oval Portrait of a Woman is a 1633 portrait painting painted by Rembrandt. It shows a woman with a millstone collar and diadem cap. It is in the collection of the Metropolitan Museum of Art.

Description
Several oval portraits of women of 17th-century Amsterdam have survived. Some are pendants and others are individual portraits. This painting has been attributed to Rembrandt since the 19th-century, but the name of the sitter is unknown. This painting came into the collection via the Benjamin Altman bequest.

This painting was documented in 1914 by Hofstede de Groot, who wrote:867. A WOMAN WITH A WHITE CAP AND RUFF. B.-HdG. 561. Half-length, without hands; life size. She is seen almost in full face, looking at the viewer. She is in black. Dark background. The light falls from the left at top. 
Signed to the left above the shoulder, "Rembrandt f. 1633"; oval oak panel, 26 1/2 inches by 20 inches. In the collection of Prince Radziwill, at the castle of Nieswiz, Lithuania. Sale. Lachnicki, Paris, June 15, 1867. In the Lachnicki collection, Warsaw. In the possession of F. Kleinberger, Paris. 
In the collection of B. Altman, New York; bequeathed as a whole in 1913 to the Museum. In the Metropolitan Museum, New York.

Other notable oval portraits of women of North Holland from the same period are:

References

Bibliography
Cat. no. 145 in Dutch Paintings in the Metropolitan Museum of Art Volume I, by Walter Liedtke, Metropolitan Museum of Art, 2007

External links
Portrait of a woman, 1633 gedateerd in the RKD
Portrait of a Woman in the Rembrandt Research Project

1633 paintings
Portraits by Rembrandt
Paintings in the collection of the Metropolitan Museum of Art
Portraits of women